Fraser Clair (born January 7, 1981) is a Canadian retired professional ice hockey forward who last played for the Hannover Indians in Germany. He spent his junior career with the Barrie Colts and the Mississauga IceDogs of the Ontario Hockey League.

External links

1981 births
Living people
Mississauga IceDogs players
Ice hockey people from Edmonton
Stockton Thunder players
Canadian ice hockey forwards